The 1983 NCAA Men's Division II Ice Hockey Tournament involved 8 schools playing in single-elimination play to determine the national champion of men's NCAA Division II college ice hockey.  A total of 12 games were played, hosted by the University of Lowell.

RIT, coached by Brian Mason, won the national title with a 4–2 victory in the final game over Bemidji State.

Dave Burkholder, of RIT, was named the Most Outstanding Player and Mike Carr, of the University of Lowell, was the high scorer of the tournament with ten points (4 goals, 6 assists).

Qualifying teams
After the majority of NAIA schools switched to the NCAA the number of western teams vying for a tournament berth ballooned and as a result the Western Regional tournament was restarted. It is not considered as part of the NCAA tournament but is displayed here for reference.

Western Regional Tournament

National Tournament Teams

Tournament bracket
The quarter-finals were two-game total-goals series played at the campus of the higher seed. The semi-finals and finals were single elimination games.

All-Tournament team

G: Dave Burkholder (RIT)
D: Mark Burgholzer (RIT)
D: Tim Road (Bemidji State)
F: Chris Johnstone (RIT)
F: Chuck Samar (RIT)
F: Paul Donato (Babson)

External links

NCAA men's ice hockey championship
 
NCAA Men's Division II Ice Hockey Tournament
NCAA Division II men's ice hockey tournament